Asya is a 1977 Soviet drama film directed by Iosif Kheifits. It is an adaptation of the 1857 novella Asya by Ivan Turgenev.

Plot 
The film is set on the banks of the Rhine. The protagonist N.N. is a strange girl named Asya, who has an extraordinary power of love.

Cast 
 Elena Koreneva as Asya
 Igor Kostolevsky as   Gagin 
 Vyacheslav Yezepov as N.N.
 Gertrud Brendler as episode
 Kirill Gun as cashier at the shipping company
 Yuri Medvedev as russian man in a German restaurant

Production
Andrei Mironov auditioned for the role of Gagin.

Awards
Prizes for Best Actress  (Elena Koreneva)  Locarno International Film Festival (Switzerland, 1976), at the Taormina Film Fest (Italy, 1978), and International Film Festival in Cobourg (France, 1977).

References

External links 
 

1977 films
1970s Russian-language films
Soviet drama films
Films based on works by Ivan Turgenev
1977 drama films
Lenfilm films
Films directed by Iosif Kheifits
Films based on Russian novels